The California State Athletic Commission (CSAC) regulates amateur and professional boxing, amateur and professional kickboxing and professional mixed martial arts (MMA) throughout the State by licensing all participants and supervising the events.

In May 2017, CSAC implemented a 10-point plan against extreme weight-cutting inclusive of fine fighters who missed contracted fight weights, missed weight fighters may ask to move to higher weight class, a 30-day and 10-day weight check for “high level title fights among others  On October 25, 2019 CSAC passed a vote of 5–0 on cancelling a fight if fighters weighted more than 15% above their contracted fight weight on the day of the event.

See also

Association of Boxing Commissions
Mixed martial arts rules

References

External links
 

Boxing in California
Athletic Commission
Sports law
Athletic commissions in the United States